Kakogawa Athletic Stadium is an athletic stadium in Kakogawa, Hyogo, Japan.

References

External links
kakogawa-sports.join-us.jp

Athletics (track and field) venues in Japan
Football venues in Japan
Sports venues in Hyōgo Prefecture
Kakogawa, Hyōgo